Sidi Moumen is an arrondissement and northeastern suburb of Casablanca, in the Sidi Bernoussi district of the Casablanca-Settat region of Morocco. As of 2004 it had 289,253 inhabitants. It contains shanty towns from where the terrorists of the 2003 and 2007 Casablanca bombings came(mainly from Karian Thoma).

References

Arrondissements of Casablanca